Secatophus australis is a species of beetle in the family Carabidae, the only species in the genus Secatophus.

References

Pterostichinae